The Franklin County Courthouse in Franklin, Nebraska is a courthouse built in 1925.  It was listed on the National Register of Historic Places in 1990.

It is a Classical Revival-style building designed by architect George A. Berlinghof.

References

External links

National Register of Historic Places in Franklin County, Nebraska
Courthouses in Nebraska
Neoclassical architecture in Nebraska
Government buildings completed in 1925